The 1865 Raglan by-election was a by-election held on 19 April 1865 in the  electorate during the 3rd New Zealand Parliament.

The by-election was caused by the resignation of the incumbent MP Charles John Taylor on 1 April 1865.

The by-election was won by William Buckland.

As no other candidates were nominated, he was declared duly elected; Joseph Crispe had retired from the contest.

References

Raglan 1865
1865 elections in New Zealand
Politics of Waikato
April 1865 events